The Advancement of Learning (full title: Of the Proficience and Advancement of Learning, Divine and Human) is a 1605 book by Francis Bacon. It inspired the taxonomic structure of the highly influential Encyclopédie by Jean le Rond d'Alembert and Denis Diderot, and is credited by Bacon's biographer-essayist Catherine Drinker Bowen with being a pioneering essay in support of empirical philosophy.

The following passage from The Advancement of Learning was used as the foreword to a popular Cambridge textbook:
So that as Tennis is a game of no use in itself, but of great use in respect it maketh a quick eye, and a body ready to put itself in all positions, so, in the Mathematics the use which is collateral, an intervenient, is no less worthy, than that which is principle and intended.

Notes

External links

 Full text on Internet Archive 
 Full text on Project Gutenberg 
 Full text at classic-literature.co.uk

Works by Francis Bacon (philosopher)
1605 books